is a professional Japanese baseball player. He plays outfielder for the Yomiuri Giants.

Yokohama DeNA BayStars 
On September 25, 2006, Kajitani was drafted by the Yokohama BayStars in the 2006 Nippon Professional Baseball draft.

In 2007-2008 season, he played in the Eastern League of NPB's minor leagues.

On April 9, 2009, Kajitani debuted in the Central League against the Yomiuri Giants.

Yomiuri Giants 
During the 2020 offseason, Kajitani exercised his free agent option. And he decided to sign a four-year deal with the Yomiuri Giants worth up to 800 million yen.

References

External links

 NPB.jp

1988 births
Living people
Japanese baseball players
Nippon Professional Baseball center fielders
Nippon Professional Baseball right fielders
Nippon Professional Baseball second basemen
Nippon Professional Baseball shortstops
Nippon Professional Baseball third basemen
Baseball people from Shimane Prefecture
Yokohama BayStars players
Yokohama DeNA BayStars players
Yomiuri Giants players